is a beat 'em up video game developed by Almanic Corporation and published by Technos Japan for the Super Famicom in 1994 exclusively in Japan. It was the fourth game in the Kunio-kun series released for the Super Famicom.

In 2021, WayForward and Arc System Works developed an English-localized version under the title of River City Girls Zero. It was released for Nintendo Switch on February 14, 2022, and on September 21 for PlayStation platforms, Windows, and Xbox platforms.

Gameplay
Compared with most of the other games in the Kunio-kun series, Kunio-tachi no Banka features a dramatic and serious storyline, with realistically proportioned character designs (in contrast to the usual "super deformed" style) and an emphasis on dialogue between battles. While there are no "stages" in the traditional sense, the game's structure is completely linear and players cannot backtrack into previously-completed areas.

Up to two players can play simultaneously. In lieu of extra lives, the game utilizes a party system in which the player can switch between different characters at any point. While Kunio and Riki are the only characters available at first, their respective girlfriends Misako and Kyoko also become playable as well throughout the course of the game. Each character has his or her own health gauge, but the game will end if the player's current character is defeated, regardless of how much health the others still have left. During a two-player game, if one player is defeated, then he will remain inactive (along with the last character he was using) until the other player either, completes the current scene, or is defeated by the enemy. Continues are unlimited and a passcode feature is available, allowing the player to restart the game at almost any scene. There are two difficulty settings as well, Normal and Easy, but the player can only proceed up to a certain point on Easy before being asked to restart the game on Normal.

The fighting system is similar to the original Nekketsu Kōha Kunio-kun (Renegade) or the Double Dragon series. All characters can punch, kick, jump, block, and attack behind them. Initially, Kunio and Riki can only perform basic moves while wearing their prison clothes. When they switch to their school uniforms, Kunio and Riki get access to more elaborate techniques such as grappling moves and individual special attacks. The fighting styles of the female characters also differ from their male counterparts (Misako and Kyoko cannot perform grab attacks for example, nor can they be grabbed by enemies).

Plot
Kunio and Riki are convicted of a hit and run and the pair are imprisoned in a juvenile correction facility. However, the two claim to be innocent. The next morning, the duo are visited by Kunio's friend Hiroshi, who informs them of a series of suspicious events transpiring in and around Nekketsu High School, including sightings of a boy with a strong resemblance to Kunio. Suspecting that they may have been framed for a crime they didn't commit, Kunio and Riki escape from prison and set out to find the person who framed them and clear their names.

Development and release 
Unlike the other Kunio-kun games released for the Super Famicom, Kunio-tachi no Banka was developed by Almanic rather than internally by Technos Japan Corp, although most of the main staff members were former employees of the company. The game was produced by Noriyuki Tomiyama (who worked on the arcade versions of Super Dodge Ball and The Combatribes) and directed by Yoshihisa Kishimoto (creator of Kunio-kun and Double Dragon), while the late Michiya Hirasawa (sound programmer in numerous Technos titles) was the lead programmer and made sound effects. Kazunaka Yamane (who worked on the original Double Dragon and Combatribes) composed the music. The game's scenario and screenplay was written by Hiro Yokokura.

The game's engine and assets would be reused for Super Mad Champ, which was originally planned to be a Kunio-kun bike racing game but was revamped into an original game. Kishimoto wrote a draft for a Kunio-tachi no Banka sequel titled , which was planned for the PlayStation, but was never actually developed.

The scene where Kunio and Riki fall down to a river along with a collapsing bridge, and find a hideout behind a waterfall, was based on an unused bit of level design from Return of Double Dragon.

The game would be the final action game in the Kunio-kun series developed by Technos Japan.

The game was released for the Super Famicom in Japan. In 2015, the company City Connection released the soundtrack to the game via digital distribution.

Reception and legacy 

Upon release, Famitsu gave Shin Nekketsu Kōha: Kunio-tachi no Banka a score of 24 out of 40. Super Console gave it 85/100. Nintendo Life gave it a score of 8 out of 10.

Kunio-tachi no Banka served as inspiration for River City Girls, a spin-off title developed and released by WayForward in September 2019. It stars Kyoko and Misako as the protagonists, and the game's lead composer Megan McDuffee arranged some of the tracks from this game. Kunio-tachi no Banka was later re-released in 2022 under the English-localized title River City Girls Zero, using Limited Run's Carbon Engine, and features dual audio for the new introductory cutscene featuring Kyoko and Misako, as well as the option to use the original translation and the new translation based on River City Girls.

Notes

References

External links
 
 Instruction manual at Giant Bomb
 Yoshihisa Kishimoto's personal homage  

Arc System Works games
1994 video games
Cooperative video games
Givro Corporation games
High school-themed video games
Interquel video games
Kunio-kun
Nintendo Switch games
PlayStation 4 games
PlayStation 5 games
Side-scrolling beat 'em ups
Super Nintendo Entertainment System games
Technōs Japan beat 'em ups
Video game prequels
Video games featuring female protagonists
Video games developed in Japan
Windows games
Xbox One games
Xbox Series X and Series S games
Multiplayer and single-player video games